Luca Colombo (born 26 December 1969) is an Italian former racing cyclist. He won the silver medal in the team time trial at the 1992 Summer Olympics. He also rode in the 1997 Tour de France, but did not finish.

Major results

1986
 1st  Team time trial, UCI Junior World Road Championships
1987
 1st  Team time trial, UCI Junior World Road Championships
1989
 2nd Time trial, National Amateur Road Championships
1990
 1st  Time trial, National Amateur Road Championships
1991
 1st  Team time trial, Mediterranean Games
 1st  Team time trial, UCI Road World Championships
1992
 1st Duo Normand (with Gianfranco Contri)
 2nd  Team time trial, Summer Olympics
1993
 1st  Team time trial, Mediterranean Games
 3rd Trofeo Papà Cervi
1994
 1st  Team time trial, UCI Road World Championships
 1st Prologue & Stage 8b (ITT) Olympia's Tour

References

External links
 

1969 births
Living people
Italian male cyclists
Cyclists at the 1992 Summer Olympics
Medalists at the 1992 Summer Olympics
Olympic cyclists of Italy
Olympic silver medalists for Italy
Cyclists from the Province of Como
Olympic medalists in cycling
UCI Road World Champions (elite men)
Mediterranean Games gold medalists for Italy
Mediterranean Games medalists in cycling
Competitors at the 1991 Mediterranean Games
Competitors at the 1993 Mediterranean Games